Sergey Superata is a Soviet sprint canoer who competed in the 1980s. He won ten medals at the ICF Canoe Sprint World Championships with five golds (K-2 500 m: 1981, 1982; K-2 1000 m: 1981, 1982; K-4 10000 m: 1989), three silver (K-2 500 m: 1983, (K-4 1000 m: 1983, 1985) and two bronzes (K-2 500 m: 1985, 1986).

References

Living people
Soviet male canoeists
Year of birth missing (living people)
Russian male canoeists
ICF Canoe Sprint World Championships medalists in kayak